John Semple (born 28 May 1889) was a Scottish footballer who played for Ayr United, Dumbarton and Luton Town.

References

1889 births
Scottish footballers
Dumbarton F.C. players
Ayr United F.C. players
Luton Town F.C. players
Scottish Football League players
English Football League players
Kirkintilloch Rob Roy F.C. players
Year of death missing
Association football fullbacks